M151 ¼-ton 4×4 utility truck is an American military utility vehicle.

M151 or M-151 may also refer to:

 M-151 (Michigan highway)
 M151 Protector, a variant of the Protector (RWS) remote weapon station